John Spencer Dunville,  (7 May 1896 – 26 June 1917) was a British Army officer and an English recipient of the Victoria Cross, the highest award for gallantry in the face of the enemy that can be awarded to British and Commonwealth forces.

Early life and education
Dunville was born on 7 May 1896 in Marylebone, London, to Colonel John Dunville Dunville and Violet Anne Blanch Dunville (née Lambart). His father was from Holywood, County Down and was chairman of Dunville & Co whisky distillers. Dunville was educated at Ludgrove School and Eton College, and was a member of the Officers' Training Corps from May 1912 to July 1914. He passed matriculation for Trinity College, Cambridge, but with the outbreak of the First World War joined the army instead.

Victoria Cross
He was aged 21 and a second lieutenant in the 1st (Royal) Dragoons, British Army during the First World War when he was awarded the Victoria Cross for his actions on 25 June 1917 near Épehy, France.

Second Lieutenant John Spencer Dunville died of wounds on 26 June 1917, the day after performing the deed, and is interred at the Villiers-Faucon Communal Cemetery, Somme, France, (Plot No. A21).

His Victoria Cross is displayed at the Household Cavalry Museum in Horse Guards in London.

References

1896 births
1917 deaths
People educated at Ludgrove School
People from Marylebone
British Army personnel of World War I
1st The Royal Dragoons officers
British World War I recipients of the Victoria Cross
British military personnel killed in World War I
People educated at Eton College
6th (Inniskilling) Dragoons officers
British Army recipients of the Victoria Cross